Ionopsis utricularioides, the delicate violet orchid, is an epiphytic orchid native to the warmer parts of the Americas. It is reported from Florida, Mexico (from Nayarit to Quntana Roo), Central America (all 7 countries), much of the West Indies including the Cayman Islands, South America as far south as Paraguay, and the Galápagos.

References

External links

US Department of Agriculture Plants Profile, Ionopsis utricularioides 
Biota of North America Program, county distribution map of Ionopsis utricularioides (in Florida)
photo of herbarium specimen at Missouri Botanical Garden, collected in Costa Rica, Ionopsis utricularioides
IOSPE orchid photos, Ionopsis utricularioides, Photo courtesy of Jay Pfahl
Atlas of Florida Vascular Plants, delicate violet orchid, Ionopsis utricularioides
Terra Galleria, the photography of QT Luong, Ionopsis utricularioides. A species orchid 

Oncidiinae
Plants described in 1788
Orchids of South America
Orchids of Central America
Orchids of Belize
Orchids of Florida
Orchids of Mexico
Flora of the Caribbean
Flora without expected TNC conservation status